Walter Brooke (born Gustav William Tweer Jr., October 23, 1914 – August 20, 1986) was an American actor.

Career
Brooke's film career stretched from You're in the Army Now (1941 to Jagged Edge (1985). One of his best-remembered roles was that of Mr. McGuire, a friend of Benjamin Braddock's parents in The Graduate (1967), who confides one sacred word to young Benjamin: "Plastics."

Brooke portrayed District Attorney Frank Scanlon in the television series The Green Hornet. He also played Clarence Johnson in The Waltons, Walter Montgomery in Paradise Bay, Billy Herbert in One Man's Family, and Judge Howe in The Lawyers. Brooke appeared in three episodes of The Incredible Hulk as Mark Roberts, an editor for the fictional National Register. (The Character of Mark Roberts first appeared in the Season 2 episode "Stop the Presses" and was played by actor Richard O' Brien.)

He played several naval officers in McHale's Navy and an unnamed district attorney in two episodes of Perry Mason: "The Case of the Floating Stones" in 1963, and "The Case of the Wrathful Wraith" in 1965. Brooke made guest appearances in four episodes of Mannix (1968 - 1974). He appeared on stage in the 1957 production of Hide and Seek at the Shubert Theatre in Washington, DC. During the 1970s he appeared in different roles in 4 episodes of The Rockford Files.

Brooke's Broadway credits include Hide and Seek (1957), Seagulls Over Sorrento (1952), Twilight Walk (1951), Two Blind Mice (1949), The Barber Had Two Sons (1943), and Romeo and Juliet (1940).

Brooke was active in the American Federation of Television and Radio Artists, serving as a director at both the local and national levels, and he served as an officer in Actor's Equity.

Death
Brooke died from emphysema in Los Angeles on August 20, 1986, aged 71. He was survived by his wife, Elizabeth Wragge Brooke, and their two children, Thomas Brooke and Christina Brooke.

Filmography

They Died with Their Boots On (1941) - Cadet Rosser (uncredited)
All Through the Night (1941) - Reporter (uncredited)
You're in the Army Now (1941) - Clerk (uncredited)
Captains of the Clouds (1942) - Duty Officer (uncredited)
Bullet Scars (1942) - Trooper Walter Leary
The Male Animal (1942) - Reporter (uncredited)
Murder in the Big House (1942) - Reporter (uncredited)
In This Our Life (1942) - Cab Driver (uncredited)
Yankee Doodle Dandy (1942) - Reporter (uncredited)
The Gay Sisters (1942) - Reporter (uncredited)
Desperate Journey (1942) - Flight Sgt. Warwick (uncredited)
The Iron Major (1943) - Lieutenant Stone (uncredited)
C-Man (1949) - Joe (uncredited)
Conquest of Space (1955) - Gen. Samuel T. Merritt
The Party Crashers (1958) - Mr. Webster
Bloodlust! (1961) - Dean Gerrard
The Wonderful World of the Brothers Grimm (1962) - The Mayor ('The Cobbler and the Elves')
Where Love Has Gone (1964) - Banker (uncredited)
The Munsters (1965, "Yes, Galen, There is a Herman") - Mr. Stewart 
The Graduate (1967) - Mr. McGuire
Yours, Mine and Ours (1968) - Howard Beardsley
How Sweet It Is! (1968) - Haskell Wax
Daddy's Gone A-Hunting (1969) - Jerry Wolfe
Marooned (1969) - Network Commentator
Zig Zag (1970) - Adam Mercer
The Landlord (1970) - Mr. Enders
Tora! Tora! Tora! (1970) - Captain Theodore Wilkinson
Lawman (1971) - Luther Harris
The Andromeda Strain (1971) - Assistant to Cabinet Secretary (uncredited)
The Return of Count Yorga (1971) - Bill Nelson
The Astronaut (1972) - Tom Everett
One Little Indian (1973) - The Doctor
Executive Action (1973) - Smythe
Harrad Summer (1974) - Sam Grove
Framed (1975) - Sen. Tatum
The Other Side of the Mountain (1975) - Dean
The Big Bus (1976) - Mr. Ames
St. Ives (1976) - Mickey
Fun with Dick and Jane (1977) - Mr. Weeks
Black Sunday (1977) - Fowler
Beyond Reason (1977) - Dr. Grovenor
North Dallas Forty (1979) - Doctor
The Nude Bomb (1980) - American Ambassador
Separate Ways (1981) - Lawrence Stevens
Hart to Hart (1981) - Carl Stevens
Prince of the City (1981) - Judge (uncredited)
Jagged Edge (1985) - Duane Bendix

Television 
 Cheyenne (1961) - Edward DeVier
Bonanza (1970) Episode: "The Big Jackpot"
 Death Valley Days (1970) - Wesley Hull in Episode: "The Biggest Little Post Office in the World"
 The Twilight Zone (1963) - Dr. Raymond Gordon in Episode 11, Season 5: "A Short Drink from a Certain Fountain"

References

External links
 
 
 

1914 births
1986 deaths
American male film actors
American male television actors
Male actors from New York City
Deaths from emphysema
20th-century American male actors